Guido Gaufridi (died 1491) was a Roman Catholic prelate who served as Titular Bishop of Troja (1478–1491).

Biography
On 4 August 1478, Guido Gaufridi was appointed during the papacy of Pope Sixtus IV as Titular Bishop of Troja. On 6 September 1478, he was consecrated bishop by Alfonso de Paradinas, Bishop of Ciudad Rodrigo, with Giuliano Maffei, Bishop of Bertinoro, serving as co-consecrator. He served as Titular Bishop of Troja until his death in 1491.

References 

15th-century Italian Roman Catholic bishops
Bishops appointed by Pope Sixtus IV
1491 deaths